The following is an alphabetical list of horror film villains.

A
 Anguirus (Godzilla Raids Again)
 Art the Clown (Terrifier) - David Howard Thornton, Mike Giannelli
 Ash (Alien) - Ian Holm

B
 Baragon (Frankenstein Conquers the World)
 Patrick Bateman (American Psycho) – Christian Bale
 Norman Bates (Psycho franchise) - Anthony Perkins, Vince Vaughn
 Billy (Black Christmas film series) - Bob Clark, Albert J. Dunk, Nick Mancuso, Robert Mann, Cainan Wiebe
 Billy the Puppet (Saw franchise) – Tobin Bell
 Biollante (Godzilla vs. Biollante)

C
 Max Cady (Cape Fear) - Robert Mitchum, Robert De Niro
 Billy Chapman (Silent Night, Deadly Night franchise) – Robert Brian Wilson
 Clover (Cloverfield)
 The Creeper (Jeepers Creepers) – Jonathan Breck

D
 Daimajin (Daimajin and its sequels) - Chikara Hashimoto
 Jerry Dandrige (Fright Night) - Chris Sarandon (Colin Farrell in the 2011 remake)
 Destoroyah (Godzilla vs. Destoroyah)
 Francis Dolarhyde a.k.a. The Tooth Fairy (Manhunter and Red Dragon) - Tom Noonan, Ralph Fiennes

E
 Ebirah (Ebirah, Horror of the Deep)

F
 Angela Franklin (Night of the Demons) - Amelia Kinkade, Shannon Elizabeth

G
 Gamera (Gamera, the Giant Monster) - Teruo Aragaki
 Ghostface (Scream franchise) - Dane Farwell (stunts), Roger L. Jackson (voice)
 Gigan (Godzilla vs. Gigan)
 Godzilla - (Gojira) - Haruo Nakajima
 Gorosaurus (King Kong Escapes)
 Graboid (Tremors franchise)
 Jamie "Jame" Gumb a.k.a. "Buffalo Bill" (The Silence of the Lambs) - Ted Levine

H
 Hedorah (Godzilla vs. Hedorah)
 Mark Hoffman (Saw IV, Saw V, Saw VI, and Saw 3D) - Costas Mandylor

I
 Igor (Universal Classic Monsters)
 Imhotep (The Mummy and its sequels) - Boris Karloff (Arnold Vosloo in the 1999 remake and its 2001 sequel)

K
 Kamacuras (Son of Godzilla)
 Kharis (The Mummy's Hand and its sequels) - Tom Tyler, Lon Chaney Jr.
 King Ghidorah (Ghidorah, the Three-Headed Monster)
 King Kong (King Kong) - Willis H. O'Brien (Andy Serkis in the 2005 remake)
 John Kramer a.k.a. Jigsaw (Saw franchise) - Tobin Bell
 Freddy Krueger a.k.a. The Springwood Slasher (A Nightmare on Elm Street) - Robert Englund, Jackie Earle Haley
 Kumonga (Son of Godzilla)

L
 Leatherface (The Texas Chainsaw Massacre) - Andrew Bryniarski, Gunnar Hansen, R. A. Mihailoff
 Hannibal Lecter (Hannibal Lecter franchise) - Anthony Hopkins, Brian Cox, Gaspard Ulliel, Mads Mikkelsen
 Lester Lowe (Silver Bullet) - Everett McGill

M
 Manda (Atragon)
 Mechagodzilla (Godzilla vs. Mechagodzilla)
 Mechani-Kong (King Kong Escapes)
 Megaguirus (Godzilla vs. Megaguirus)
 Megalon (Godzilla vs. Megalon)
 Mictlāntēcutli (El Muerto)
 Moguera (The Mysterians)
 MUTO (Godzilla)
 Michael Myers (Halloween franchise) - George P. Wilbur, Tyler Mane, Nick Castle, Don Shanks, Bradley Loree, James Jude Courtney.
 Samara Morgan (The Ring and its sequels) - Daveigh Chase, Kelly Stables, Bonnie Morgan

O
 Count Orlok (Nosferatu) - Max Schreck

P
 Santanico Pandemonium (From Dusk till Dawn) - Salma Hayek
 Rustin Parr - (Blair Witch franchise) Frank Pastor
 Rhoda Penmark (The Bad Seed and its 1985/2018 remakes) - Patty McCormack, Carrie Wells, Mckenna Grace
 Pinhead a.k.a. Captain Elliott Spencer (Hellraiser and its sequels) - Doug Bradley
 David Powers (The Lost Boys) - Kiefer Sutherland
 Predator (Predator) - Kevin Peter Hall, Ian Whyte, Brian Steele, Carey Jones, Derek Mears

R
 Charles Lee Ray a.k.a. Chucky (Child's Play franchise) - Brad Dourif, David Kohlsmith, Tyler Barish, Mark Hamill
 Rodan (Rodan)
 Daniel Robitaille a.k.a. "the Candyman" (Candyman film series) - Tony Todd

S
 Kayako Saeki, Toshio Saeki (The Grudge) – Takako Fuji, Yuya Ozeki
 Slappy the Dummy (Goosebumps) – Jack Black
 Slender Man (Slender Man) – Javier Botet
 SpaceGodzilla (Godzilla vs. SpaceGodzilla)
 Captain Spaulding (Firefly film series) – Sid Haig
 Emma Spool (Psycho II) – Claudia Bryar
 Krug Stillo (Last House on the Left) – David Hess

T
 Larry Talbot (The Wolf Man franchise) - Lon Chaney Jr., Benicio del Toro
 Ed Thompson (Fright Night film series) - Stephen Geoffreys, Christopher Mintz-Plasse in the 2011 remake
 Damien Thorn (The Omen) - Harvey Spencer Stephens
 Titanosaurus (Terror of Mechagodzilla)
 Sweeney Todd (Sweeney Todd: The Demon Barber of Fleet Street) - Johnny Depp
 Jack Torrance (The Shining) - Jack Nicholson
 Tall Man (Phantasm) - Angus Scrimm
 Judge Turpin (Sweeney Todd, The Demon Barber of Fleet Street) - Alan Rickman

V
 Tiffany Valentine (Bride of Chucky and its sequels) - Jennifer Tilly
 Varan (Varan the Unbelievable)
 Mason Verger (Hannibal) - Gary Oldman
 Jason Voorhees (Friday the 13th Part 2 and its sequels) - Kane Hodder, C. J. Graham, Ken Kirzinger, Derek Mears
 Pamela Voorhees (Friday the 13th) - Betsy Palmer, Marilyn Poucher, Paula Shaw, Nana Visitor

W
 Harry Warden a.k.a. The Miner (My Bloody Valentine) - Peter Cowper, Richard John Walters
 Annie Wilkes (Misery) - Kathy Bates

X
 Xenomorph (Alien franchise) - Bolaji Badejo, Tom Woodruff Jr.

Y
 Sadako Yamamura (Ring) - Rie Inō
 Ygor (Son of Frankenstein and The Ghost of Frankenstein) - Bela Lugosi
 Yonggary - (Yongary, Monster from the Deep) - Cho Kyoung-min
 Amanda Young (Saw, Saw II, Saw III, Saw VI) - Shawnee Smith

Z
 Zilla (Godzilla)
 Frank Zito (Maniac and its 2012 remake)
 Zombietoid (Dollman vs. Demonic Toys)

See also
 List of comedy horror films
 List of natural horror films
 List of horror anime
 Lists of horror films
 List of horror video games

References

Villains
Horror film